Forever Knight is a Canadian television series about Nick Knight, an 800-year-old vampire working as a police detective in modern-day Toronto, Ontario. Wracked with guilt for centuries of killing others, he seeks redemption by working as a homicide detective on the night shift while struggling to find a way to become human again. The series premiered on May 5, 1992, and concluded with the third-season finale on May 17, 1996.

Plot
The series followed the adventures of Nick Knight, a Toronto cop working the graveyard shift with his partner Donald Schanke. Unbeknownst to most of his colleagues, Nick is actually Nicholas, an 800-year-old vampire (his human surname was reference to his status as a literal knight in medieval France).  Remorseful over centuries spent as a vampiric cold-hearted killer, Nicholas works as a cop and often ends up using his special abilities to bring criminals to justice.  Whenever he works on his cases, Nicholas remembers similar situations from previous lifetimes and these appear as flashbacks in the episodes.  Nicholas explains his need to work on the night shift by claiming to have a skin disorder, photodermatitis, which requires him to stay out of sunlight.  Refusing to feed from humans, he survives by drinking bottled animal blood, something that most vampires find repulsive.  The only human who knows his true nature is his friend Natalie Lambert, a city medical examiner who doesn't like Nicholas using his special powers as she believes it increases his need for blood.

Nick's ultimate dream is to find a way to become human once again, but his quest for redemption is complicated by the arrival of fellow vampires Lucien LaCroix and Janette DuCharme.  Lucien LaCroix, who was a general in the early Roman Empire, and who was turned into a vampire by his daughter Divia as Mount Vesuvius erupted in 79AD, originally made Nick a vampire in 1228. Janette was also 'brought across' by LaCroix, before he brought Nick across. They were Nick's companions for many centuries until he left them, seeking redemption and a way to reclaim his lost humanity.  Janette now runs a night club, while LaCroix works as a late-night talk radio host.  While Janette is scornful yet tolerant of Nicholas's new lifestyle, LaCroix actively attempts to seduce his protégé back to a more violent life.

During the series, Nick had two partners. For the first two seasons it is Don Schanke.  At the beginning of the third season, Detective Schanke dies in an airplane explosion caused by a bomber, and Nick is assigned a new partner, Tracy Vetter, a rookie detective who gets the assignment due to her father's high-ranking position in the police force.  Tracy finds herself increasingly attracted to Javier Vachon, also a new character, who is a vampire who had been a conquistador in life. Nick and Vachon know about each other, and Tracy knows about Vachon being a vampire, but she never knows Nick is also a vampire. Although Nick continues to protect the "innocent" civilians, he faces circumstances that risk the exposure of the vampire community who, up until this time, were unknown to other humans.  Nick is faced with the choice to either move on or attempt to recapture his humanity through a method that puts Natalie's life in the balance.  At that point LaCroix appears and indicates the time to leave is near and he must either bring Natalie over or leave her to die.  Nicholas decides that neither option is acceptable and hands LaCroix a wooden stake.  We do not see what LaCroix does, but we hear him say "Damn you, Nicholas" in stress and frustration, and the scene cuts out to the building where Nick lives and a shot of the sun rising.
The ending is left to the viewers' interpretation but the implication is that Nick dies with LaCroix's help, hoping to join Natalie in an afterlife.

Cast
 Geraint Wyn Davies as Detective Nick Knight
 Nigel Bennett as Lucien LaCroix
 Deborah Duchêne as Janette DuCharme
 Catherine Disher as Natalie Lambert
 John Kapelos as Detective Donald Schanke (seasons 1 & 2)
 Gary Farmer as Captain Joe Stonetree (season 1)
 Natsuko Ohama as Captain Amanda Cohen (season 2)
 Ben Bass as Javier Vachon (season 3)
 Lisa Ryder as Detective Tracy Vetter (season 3)
 Blu Mankuma as Captain Joe Reese (season 3)
 Greg Kramer as Screed (season 3)

Production

Development
The series originated as a 1989 CBS television movie, Nick Knight, with Rick Springfield playing the title character. In 1992, CBS began broadcasting the series as part of its Crimetime After Primetime lineup, with a new name and with Geraint Wyn Davies now playing Nick Knight (using a pilot that had been re-shot with Davies).

The concept of vampires in the Forever Knight universe

Vampires in society
Though not the first sympathetic vampire detective in fiction (Hannibal King, a vampire private eye who similarly refused to indulge his blood lust, preceded him in the pages of Marvel Comics' Tomb of Dracula by some years), Forever Knight helped popularize the concept. As such, it is seen as a direct precursor to other vampire detective/investigator shows such as Angel and Blood Ties. It also influenced shows featuring more broadly supernatural detectives, such as The Dresden Files.

In common with other vampire literature of the 1990s, when AIDS was a common societal anxiety, vampirism in Forever Knight is partly approached as a disease to be overcome. The Elizabeth Glaser Pediatric AIDS Foundation is series star Geraint Wyn Davies' favoured charity; the "Bridging the Knight" fan event raised money for Casey House, an AIDS hospice in Toronto, helped in part by donations from Forever Knight producer Nicolas Gray, as well as the series' actors and crew.

Vampire powers
Nick Knight, as well as several other vampire characters, demonstrates a number of superhuman abilities. As a vampire, Nick has not aged throughout nearly 800 years of existence. In most cases he is invulnerable to harm from gunshot, blunt force trauma, or blade. Vampires in the Forever Knight universe display the powers of super strength and speed, enhanced senses, flight and a degree of hypnotism/mind control. However, Nick's hypnotism does not always work, especially if the victim has physical evidence that proves opposite to what Nick would have him or her believe. Vampires in the Forever Knight universe are not reanimated corpses as their hearts beat a few times every ten minutes, as is stated in one episode. None of the vampires turn into such things as bats, wolves, mist or fog.

Two episodes reveal that vampirism in the Forever Knight universe is to some degree a psychosomatic condition. Although vampires suffer the standard aversion to garlic and combust in the presence of holy objects or sunlight, vampires that have forgotten what they are, due to suffering a physical or mental trauma, are completely unaffected by these things.

Episodes

The series aired on CBS from May 5, 1992, to March 2, 1993, in First-run syndication from September 12, 1994, to July 24, 1995, and on USA Network from September 11, 1995, to May 13, 1996, running for three seasons and a total of 70 episodes. Reruns were also seen in syndication during the mid-to-late 90s.

Sky UK in the United Kingdom broadcast it during 1995 on Sky One at 11pm, marking the only time it was shown in the UK, as it has never been rerun.

Home media
Sony Pictures Home Entertainment has released the entire series on DVD in Region 1 (US only) in 3 volume sets. Madman Entertainment released the entire series in Region 4 (Australia), in the same format.

In other media

Novels
There have been three novels written based on the series:

Soundtracks
There have been two soundtrack CDs released that contain selections from the score. The first was released on 25 July 1996 and the second was released on 11 May 1999

Reception

Awards
Forever Knight was nominated for 13 Gemini Awards, and won once in 1996. It was also nominated for a Golden Reel Award in 1992, but did not win. It was ranked #23 on TV Guide's Top Cult Shows Ever in 2004,  but was taken off the list in 2007.

See also

Vampire film
Angel, an American TV series, also about a vampire seeking redemption after being cursed with a conscience.
List of vampire television series

References

External links

Forever Knight official site (Sci Fi Channel). Archived from the original on April 5, 2004.
 
 

 
Canadian horror fiction television series
1992 Canadian television series debuts
1996 Canadian television series endings
CBS original programming
English-language television shows
Television series by Glen-Warren Productions
Television series by Universal Television
Television series by Sony Pictures Television
Television shows filmed in Toronto
Television shows set in Toronto
Vampire detective shows
Vampires in television
Romantic fantasy television series
Television shows about reincarnation
Works about atonement
1990s Canadian crime drama television series